Zhongmu railway station is a railway station of Longhai railway located in Zhongmu County, Zhengzhou, Henan, China.

The station is currently out of passenger services.

History 
The station was opened in 1910.

References 

Railway stations in Henan
Railway stations in Zhengzhou
Railway stations in China opened in 1910
Stations on the Longhai Railway